Nabaa may refer to:

Places
Naba'a, a densely populated suburb in the municipality of Bourj Hammoud, in Matn District, Lebanon
Ras el-Nabaa, a sector in the city of Beirut, Lebanon 
Nabaa Al Safa, village in Aley District, Lebanon

Persons
Naba'a, a powerful leader of Gonja people in the 1600s and its kingdom in northern Ghana
Nazir Nabaa (born 1938), Syrian painter

See also
Naba (disambiguation)